ISO 3166-2:PY is the entry for Paraguay in ISO 3166-2, part of the ISO 3166 standard published by the International Organization for Standardization (ISO), which defines codes for the names of the principal subdivisions (e.g., provinces or states) of all countries coded in ISO 3166-1.

Currently for Paraguay, ISO 3166-2 codes are defined for 1 capital and 17 departments. The capital of the country Asunción has special status equal to the departments.

Each code consists of two parts, separated by a hyphen. The second part is either of the following:
 one or two digits (1–16, 19): departments
 three letters: capital district

Current codes
Subdivision names are listed as in the ISO 3166-2 standard published by the ISO 3166 Maintenance Agency (ISO 3166/MA).

Click on the button in the header to sort each column.

See also
 Subdivisions of Paraguay
 FIPS region codes of Paraguay

External links
 ISO Online Browsing Platform: PY
 Departments of Paraguay, Statoids.com

2:PY
ISO 3166-2
Paraguay geography-related lists